Antoine Idji Kolawolé (born 1946) is a Beninese politician.  He was the Minister of Foreign Affairs of Benin from 1998 to 2003 and the President of the National Assembly from 2003 to 2007.

Political career
Kolawolé was born in 1946 in Illikimou, near Kétou, Benin. Under President Mathieu Kérékou, Kolawolé served as Minister of Foreign Affairs from May 1998 to May 2003, when he resigned. In the March 2003 parliamentary election, his party, the African Movement for Development and Progress (MADEP), participated in the Presidential Movement, which supported Kérékou, and Kolawolé was elected as President of the National Assembly on April 25, 2003.

Kolawolé served as First Vice-President of MADEP, and in September 2005 he was designated as the party's presidential candidate for the March 2006 presidential election. In the election, he took fifth place with 3.25% of the vote in the first round.

He was re-elected to the National Assembly in the March 2007 parliamentary election as part of the Alliance for a Dynamic Democracy. Mathurin Nago was elected by the National Assembly to succeed Kolawolé as its President on May 3, 2007.

In the April 2015 parliamentary election, he was re-elected to the National Assembly as a candidate of the Union Makes the Nation coalition in the 21st constituency.

References

External links 
 Foreign Affairs and Co-operation, January 1, 2001
 Resignation
 Spécial Présidentielles 2006 
 Presidentials

1946 births
Living people
Presidents of the National Assembly (Benin)
Members of the National Assembly (Benin)
Foreign ministers of Benin
African Movement for Development and Progress politicians
Candidates for President of Benin